Arun Vora is an Indian politician and member of the Indian National Congress. Arun Vora has been popular leader in the  Durg City constituency Assembly from where he has been MLA two times.

Arun Vora belongs to a family of journalists and political stalwarts of national stature. Vora is educated with master's degree. His father Motilal Vora was treasurer of All India Congress Committee, ex-chief minister of Madhya Pradesh. 

Currently Arun Vora is member of the Chhattisgarh Legislative Assembly in 2014 from the  Durg City constituency in Chhattisgarh.

References

People from Durg
Living people
Year of birth missing (living people)
Chhattisgarh MLAs 2018–2023
Chhattisgarh MLAs 2013–2018